is a Japanese Greco-Roman wrestler and mixed martial artist. Throughout his career, he notably claimed the '16 Olympic Silver medal at 59kg, the '19 World Championship at 63kg, the '18 Asian Games Gold medal at 60kg and three Asian Championship medals (champion in 2018 at 60 kg).

Wrestling career
Ota began participating in major international and domestic wrestling tournaments while attending the Nippon Sport Science University. As a third-year student he won the Hungarian Wrestling Grand Prix, and as a fourth-year student he won the Emperor's Cup.

Ota took part in the 2016 Asian Olympic qualifier tournament, held between March 18–20, 2021, competing in the 59 kg Greco Roman event. He was scheduled to face the six-time world champion and 2012 Olympic gold medalist Hamid Sourian in the opening round. Despite coming into the match as a significant underdog, Ota pulled off an upset victory, beating Sourian 7-4 on points. Ota would furthermore beat Phils Tuktaev in the quarterfinals and Kim Seung-Hak in the semifinals, before losing to Wang Lumin in the finals. Despite this loss, he won the right to participate in the Olympic Games.

Ota was scheduled to fight a rematch with Hamid Sourian in the opening round of the 2016 Olympic games. Despite losing 4-0 by the end of the first half of the match, Ota mounted a comeback in the second half, winning by 6-5 on points. He beat Almat Kebispayev 6-0 in the next round, Stig-André Berge 4-0 in the quarterfinals and Rovshan Bayramov in the semifinals, which guaranteed him the silver medal. Ota faced the Cuban Ismael Borrero in the final match, and lost by technical fall.

Ota won the 2018 Asian Games 60 kg Greco-Roman event.

Ota participated in the 2019 All-Japan Selection Championship for the 2020 Olympic Games, taking part in the 60 kg Greco-Roman event. He lost to the 2019 World Championship winner Kenichiro Fumita 1-4 in the finals. As this rendered him unable to participate in the Olympic Games, Ota opted to take part in the 67 kg Greco-Roman event as well. He lost the very first match.

Mixed martial arts career
Following his retirement from wrestling competition, he signed with Rizin Fighting Federation. Tokoro made his professional debut against Hideo Tokoro at Rizin 26 on December 31, 2020. He lost the fight by a second-round armbar.

Ota faced the former K-1 Welterweight champion Yuta Kubo at Rizin 30 on September 19, 2021. He won the fight by unanimous decision.

Ota faced 46-fight veteran Kazuma Sone at Rizin 33 - Saitama on December 31, 2021. He won the fight by a second-round technical knockout.

Ota faced the former DEEP bantamweight champion Yuki Motoya at Rizin 37 - Saitama on July 31, 2022. He lost the fight by unanimous decision.

Mixed martial arts record

|-
|Loss
|align=center| 2–2
|Yuki Motoya
|Decision (unanimous)
|Rizin 37
|
|align=center| 3
|align=center| 5:00
|Saitama, Japan
|
|-
|Win
|align=center|2–1
|Kazuma Sone
|TKO (soccer kicks and stomps)
|Rizin 33
|
|align=center|2
|align=center|3:55
|Saitama, Japan
|
|-
|Win
|align=center|1–1
|Yuta Kubo
|Decision (unanimous)
|Rizin 30
|
|align=center|3
|align=center|5:00
|Saitama, Japan
|
|-
|Loss
|align=center|0–1
|Hideo Tokoro
|Submission (armbar)
|Rizin 26
|
|align=center|2
|align=center|2:23
|Saitama, Japan
|

See also
 List of male mixed martial artists

References

External links 

 

1993 births
Living people
Japanese male sport wrestlers
Wrestlers at the 2016 Summer Olympics
Medalists at the 2016 Summer Olympics
Olympic silver medalists for Japan
Sportspeople from Aomori Prefecture
Nippon Sport Science University alumni
Olympic wrestlers of Japan
Olympic medalists in wrestling
Wrestlers at the 2018 Asian Games
Medalists at the 2018 Asian Games
Asian Games gold medalists for Japan
Asian Games medalists in wrestling
World Wrestling Championships medalists
Asian Wrestling Championships medalists
Japanese male mixed martial artists
Mixed martial artists utilizing Greco-Roman wrestling
21st-century Japanese people
20th-century Japanese people